Heliocles I (reigned 145–120 BCE) was a Greco-Bactrian king, brother and successor of Eucratides the Great, and considered (along with his co-ruler and son/nephew Heliocles II) the last Greek king to reign over the Bactrian country. His reign was a troubled one; according to Roman historian Justin, Eucratides was murdered crossing the Hindu Kush by one of his sons, although this is highly disputed and Justin fails to name the perpetrator. Eucratides’ death led to instability, even civil war, which caused the Indian parts of the empire to be lost to Indo-Greek king Menander I and southern Bactria to be lost to the Yuezhi.

Yuezhi invasion
From 130 BCE a nomadic people, the Yuezhi, started to invade Bactria from the north and we could assume that Heliocles was killed in battle during this invasion. Details from Chinese sources seem to indicate that the nomad invasion did not end civilisation in Bactria entirely. Hellenised cities continued to exist for some time, and the well-organised agricultural systems were not demolished.

The Yuezhi would copy and adapt the coin types of Heliocles for a long time.

Continuation of the Indo-Greek kingdom
Even if this was the end of the original Greco-Bactrian kingdom, the Greeks continued to rule in northwestern India to the beginning of the 1st century AD, under the Indo-Greek Kingdom. It is unclear whether the Diodotid dynasty of Eucratides was extinguished with the death of Heliocles I or if members of the family emigrated eastwards. Several later Indo-Greek kings, including Heliocles II, struck coins which could be associated with the dynasty.

References
 The Shape of Ancient Thought. Comparative studies in Greek and Indian Philosophies by Thomas McEvilley (Allworth Press and the School of Visual Arts, 2002) 
 Buddhism in Central Asia by B. N. Puri (Motilal Banarsidass Pub, January 1, 2000)  
 The Greeks in Bactria and India, W. W. Tarn, Cambridge University Press.

External links
Coins of Heliocles
More coins of Heliocles
Catalogue of the Coins of Heliocles I and Scythian Imitations

Greco-Bactrian kings
2nd-century BC rulers in Asia
Diodotid dynasty
Greek Buddhist monarchs